Éric Deblicker (born 17 April 1952) is a former tennis player and coach from France.

Deblicker reached a career-high singles ranking of world No. 76, in June 1976. He was captain of the French Davis Cup team before Patrice Dominguez.

Deblicker has coached prominent French tennis players, such as Sébastien Grosjean, Arnaud Clément, Paul-Henri Mathieu and Richard Gasquet.

His wife Nicole died in the 1989 terrorist bombing of Brazzaville-Paris UTA Flight 772. He recounts his grief and his career in an autobiography he wrote with his son, published in 2007. On 20 February 2017, he was appointed advisor to the new president of the French Tennis Federation.

References

External links
 
 
 

1952 births
Living people
French male tennis players
French tennis coaches
Sportspeople from Neuilly-sur-Seine